Mothers' Instinct may refer to:
 Mothers' Instinct (2018 film), a Belgian psychological thriller film
 Mothers' Instinct (upcoming film), an upcoming psychological thriller film, a remake of the above
 The maternal bond that forms between a mother and her child

See also
 A Mother's Instinct, a 1996 American mystery drama television film 
 The Mother Instinct, a 1917 American silent drama film